Preston Barracks was a military installation on Lewes Road, Brighton. All of the buildings on the site (except for the Crimean War Building) have been demolished, most recently in 2018, with mainly student residences and a retail park built on the site.

History
The barracks were built in the regency style as part of the British response to the threat of the French Revolution and were completed in 1793. The barracks were designed to accommodate artillery and cavalry units and included stables for up to 1,000 horses. The structures included a building originally built as a canteen but which was converted into a military hospital in 1820: it went on to be used as a location for various military meetings, including courts-martial, chaired by Lieutenant-Colonel the Earl of Cardigan, who commanded the 11th Light Dragoons at the barracks in the 1840s and who then commanded the light brigade at the Battle of Balaklava during the Crimean War. This structure later became known as the Crimean War Building.

Married quarters were added in the 1850s and a new officers' mess was built in around 1900. The original regency barracks, at the southern end of the site, were largely demolished in 1990 and that part of the site is now occupied by the Pavilion Retail Park.

The northern end of the site was used as a Territorial Army Centre until around 2000; it is now however largely derelict. However, the Crimean War Building survives and remains in Ministry of Defence ownership for use as an Army Cadet Force Centre. The officers' mess is also still standing but is empty.

The northern end of the site was acquired by Brighton and Hove City Council in 2002: there are plans to develop this part of the site for the University of Brighton’s Business School. The university's vice chancellor, Debra Humphris, advocated for a £300m transformation of the barracks into student residences and the university's business school.

The Preston Barracks regeneration project, nicknamed 'The Big Build', will create 369 homes, 1,338 student bedrooms, a medical centre and pharmacy, an academic building for the University of Brighton, shops, cafes, sport and recreation facilities, car parking and a pedestrian bridge which will cross Lewes Road (the A270).

References

Barracks in England
Installations of the British Army
Buildings and structures in Brighton and Hove